Beckles v. United States, 580 U.S. ___ (2017), was a case in which the United States Supreme Court evaluated whether the residual clause in the United States Advisory Sentencing Guidelines was unconstitutionally vague.

On November 28, 2016, oral arguments were heard, where a private attorney appeared for the accused, Deputy U.S. Solicitor General Michael Dreeben appeared for the government, and a professor appeared as a court appointed amicus curiae to defend the lower court's opinion.

On March 6, 2017, the Supreme Court delivered judgment in favor of the government, voting unanimously to affirm the lower court. In an opinion written by Justice Clarence Thomas, the Court held that "the  advisory Guidelines are not subject to vagueness challenges under the Due Process Clause" of the Fifth Amendment of the United States Constitution.

Justice Anthony Kennedy wrote a brief concurrence.

Justice Ruth Bader Ginsburg concurred only in the judgment, stressing that the commentary to the Guidelines specifically mentioned Beckles' offense.

Justice Sonia Sotomayor also concurred only in the judgment, agreeing with Ginsburg that the commentary to the Guidelines applied to Beckles, but going on to opine that the Guidelines as a whole may still be unconstitutionally vague.

See also
 List of United States Supreme Court cases
 Lists of United States Supreme Court cases by volume
 List of United States Supreme Court cases by the Roberts Court

References

External links
 
 Case page at SCOTUSblog

United States Supreme Court cases of the Roberts Court
United States Supreme Court cases
2017 in United States case law